is a Grand Prix motorcycle racer from Japan. He has previously competed in the MFJ All Japan Road Race GPMono Championship, the MFJ All Japan Road Race J-GP3 Championship and the Spanish Moto3 series.

Career statistics

By season

Races by year

References

External links

1994 births
Japanese motorcycle racers
Living people
125cc World Championship riders
Moto3 World Championship riders